Ruslan Akun (Kyrgyz: Руслан Акун; Russian: Руслан Акун; born November 30, 1984) is a Kyrgyz director, producer and screenwriter who has worked on films and TV shows. He is best known for Salam, New York (2013), Herding (2014) and Kok boru: Time persistent (2018).

Early life
Akun grew up in the small town of Naryn bordering China. As a student and TV producer, he covered two revolutions, ethnic clash, and witnessed turbulent changes happening in his newly independent country of Kyrgyzstan.

Career
After graduating from American University - Central Asia, Akun's advocacy for positive social changes in his country made him direct and produce educational films. He was commissioned by Swiss Red Cross to write and direct health-related educational films for school children and young people in Kyrgyz countryside. Follow-up effectiveness evaluations showed that, for instance, a fictionalized educational film on dental health were successful with number of children brushing their teeth twice a day growing from 37% to 71%. In addition, Akun created and produced several prime-time political TV shows on Kyrgyz National Public TV.

In 2011, Akun and his friends wrote a script and filmed non-actors. The movie came out about 110 minutes long and was about Bishkek. Friends also negotiated the theatre release of his film Bishkek, I love you!].

His second independent film Salam, New York became the biggest box office hit in a history of Kyrgyz Republic. The film won Best Film, Best Director, Best Original Screenplay, Best Music, Best Editing awards at the Kyrgyz National Cinema Awards. During the theatre release, pirates leaked the film but were stopped by Akun's company and Intellectual Property Agency Kyrgyz Patent. It was the first time piracy was persecuted in Kyrgyzstan's history.

Akun's short film Herding was selected to more than 50  film festivals international competition section worldwide including Clermont-Ferrand, San Paolo, and Brussels.

Since 2014, Akun pursuing his master's degree at School of Cinematic Arts, University of Southern California; he holds a bachelor's degree from Mass Communications, American University - Central Asia.

Filmography
 My Girlfriend's Hero (Герой моей девушки), 2015
 Director's Cut, 2015
 Herding, 2014
 Salam, New York (Салам, Нью-Йорк), 2013
 Bishkek, I Love You (Бишкек, я тебя люблю), 2011
 Thank You! (Рахмат), 2010
 No Regrets(Не тужить), 2009
 Am I Really Going to Die Being Such a Beauty? (Я такая красивая, неужели я умру?), 200
 Time persistent'' (Время стойких), 2018

References

External links

 Official website
 

1984 births
Living people
Kyrgyzstani screenwriters
Kyrgyzstani film directors
USC School of Cinematic Arts alumni